The Evangelical-Lutheran Church in Hungary (ELCH) is a Protestant Lutheran denomination in Hungary. In 2019, there were 176,000 baptized members.

The church has three dioceses, with nearly 300 parishes and 500 places of worship in Hungary, and is the third largest Christian denomination in Hungary. It is currently led by Presiding Bishop Tamás Fabiny.

History
Lutheranism arrived early in the Kingdom of Hungary, but was repressed by the Roman Catholic Habsburg dynasty. During the "Mourning Decade" (1671–1681) Hungarian Lutherans, along with the Reformed Church in Hungary, were severely persecuted. There was a renewal with Pietism, and the Deed of Tolerance issued by king Joseph II in 1781 granted religious freedom. Protestant churches were fully recognized after the restoration of the sovereignty of Hungary in 1867.

Structure
The Evangelical-Lutheran Church in Hungary consists of three dioceses, each led by a bishop:
 Northern Diocese (Északi Evangélikus Egyházkerület)
 Southern Diocese (Déli Evangélikus Egyházkerület)
 Western (Transdanubian) Diocese (Nyugati (Dunántúli) Evangélikus Egyházkerület)

One diocesan bishop is elected to head the national church as Presiding Bishop. The highest decision making body is the Synod, which consists of all the bishops, plus representatives (both lay and ordained) from each diocese.

Education
The ELCH has an extensive educational programme. This includes seminary training for its ordination candidates, lay training programmes for its local and regional lay leaders, a network of 46 schools covering age ranges from nursery education to secondary school, and three higher education institutions (colleges and universities).

Affiliations
The church is member of the World Council of Churches, the Conference of European Churches, Ecumenical Council of Churches in Hungary, the Lutheran World Federation, and the Community of Protestant Churches in Europe.

See also
 List of Lutheran dioceses and archdioceses

References

External links

Protestantism in Hungary
Lutheranism in Europe
Lutheran denominations
Lutheran World Federation members